Mario Sabatini (born 20 January 1943) is a retired German freestyle wrestler. He placed fourth-fifth at the European championships in 1972–1974 and competed at the 1972 Summer Olympics.

References

External links
 

1943 births
Living people
Olympic wrestlers of West Germany
Wrestlers at the 1972 Summer Olympics
German male sport wrestlers
Sportspeople from Freiburg im Breisgau
20th-century German people